The Israel Defense Forces 91st Division, known also as the Galilee Formation (Utzbat HaGalil), is a territorial division in the IDF Northern Command, responsible for the front with Lebanon, from Rosh HaNikra to Mount Hermon.

Its headquarters are located at Biranit, Israel, along with a military police investigations base.

Units
 91st "Galilee" Division
 300th "Bar'am" (Territorial) Infantry Brigade
 769th "Hiram" (Territorial) Infantry Brigade
 3rd "Alexandroni" (Reserve) Infantry Brigade
 8th (Reserve) Armor Brigade
 7338th (Reserve) Artillery Regiment
 671st "Nofim" Signals Battalion
 869th "Shahaf/Seagull" Field Intelligence Battalion

Divisions of Israel
Northern Command (Israel)